The 10th Kisei was the 10th edition of the Kisei tournament. Since Cho Chikun won the previous year, he is given an automatic place in the final. Twelve players battled in a knockout tournament to decide the final 2. Those two would then play each other in a best-of-3 match to decide who would face Cho. Koichi Kobayashi became the challenger after beating Masao Kato 2 games to 1, and went on to defeat Cho Chikun 4 games to 2.

Tournament

Challenger finals

Finals 

Kisei (Go)
1986 in go